The Gypsies are a Sri Lankan baila band that performs Sinhala and English songs. The band was founded in the early 1970s and has since garnered a huge fan base across Sri Lanka and is one of Sri Lanka's most famous bands. They are a highly paid band in Sri Lanka, as they constantly perform at parties, dances and at many concerts.

The band was once banned by the Government of Sri Lanka due to many of its songs carrying antigovernmental sentiments.

History
The band was formed in 1970 by Anton Perera, father of lead singer Sunil Perera and a confectioner working for the Glucorasa company. The band composed of his five sons- Sunil, Nihal, Piyal, Nimal and Lal- all of whom had recently completed high school. Anton Perera renovated a portion of his house on Galle Road (in Rathmalana) into a recording studio and the band began recording their first album.

Initially, the band only performed western music, but after a few years, the band began to perform Sinhala songs as well, and eventually the band members began composing their own Sinhala music. The first Sinhala songs released by the Gypsies, Linda Langa Sangamaya and Amma Amma, were released in 1973.

In the thirty years that followed, many changes have occurred in the group's membership that have led to the eight members present today. As of today, Piyal Perera is the only living member from the original line up.

The early success of the Gypsies was thanks to a series of 5 albums released by the band in the late 1970s (entitled Dance With the Gypsies). In the 1980s the group released their first audio cassette containing their novelty hit Kurumitto (Dwarfs), which was a translated cover of Dutch musician Father Abraham's The Smurf Song. With the arrival of CDs in Sri Lanka, the Gypsies released their first CD Gypsies Gold containing 17 songs, and following its success, the band released two more CDs, Dance With the Gypsies and Signore, which were also well received by fans.

The Gypsies have since released many other records and continue to enjoy success. Sunil Perera and the Gypsies were world-famous for their baila music. The Gypsies have also collaborated with other Sri Lankan stars like Desmond De Silva, and are credited for composing the first ever baila non-stop medley.

Their first performance outside of Sri Lanka, in Delhi, as the resident band of the Delhi Taj Hotel for three months, was followed by many more tours in other foreign countries, where many members of the Sri Lankan diaspora reside, such as the United Kingdom, Singapore, United States, New Zealand, Australia and Canada.

Corrine Almeida, the long-standing female vocalist of the group, and Sharon Nesaduray, better known as "Lulu", eventually left the group. Radhika Rajavellu is the latest addition to the band after the departure of their well known female vocalist Ginger (Judith White). The current female singer is Monique Wille (Ex-Ultimate).

Buongiorno was released in 2018, which was the first hit song to be released under Gypsies label after a period of four years.

On 6 August 2021, Sunil Perera tested positive for COVID-19, and was put on oxygen after experiencing breathing difficulties. Rumors of Perera's death began circulating on social media. In spite of his treatment, on 5 September, Perera was re-admitted to the hospital due to pneumonia and died in the early hours of 6 September 2021, one week before his 69th birthday.

The Gypsies celebrated its Golden Jubilee amidst the COVID-19 pandemic in 2021 by arranging several virtual concerts, to commemorate 50 years since the band's formation.

Members

Current 
Piyal Perera – percussion, vocals
Kamal Perera – lead guitar, vocals
Dushan Jayathilake – keyboards, vocals
Monique Wille – vocals
Shezry Shiradjudeen – bass
Lal Witawilla – drums

Former 

 Sunil Perera – lead vocals (1970–2021) (died 2021)
 Corrine Almeida – vocals
 Sharon Nesaduray –
 Ginger (Judith White) –
 Dileepa Mangala –
 Ronnie Leitch – vocals (1989) (died 2018)
 Gordon Athula – drums
 Ranil Vas –

Discography
 The Beginning
 Signore
 Gold
 Piti Kotapan None
 Dance With The Gypsies
 This Land Belongs To You
 Oye Ojaye
 Lankawe Ape Lankawe 
 Kurumitto
 Lunu Dehi
 I Don't Know Why

References

External links
 Official Website
 
 Photos from Gypsies Dinner Dance in Houston on 10 May 2008
 Dance with Gypsies Video - Nonstop karaoke Part 1: Edited by a fan
 Dance with Gypsies Video - Nonstop karaoke Part 2: Edited by a fan
 Wenwela Giyath Gypsies Video : Edited by a fan
 Gypsies Songs List

Sri Lankan musical groups
Musical groups established in 1970
1970 establishments in Ceylon